Below is a list of First and Principal Naval Aides-de-Camp, an office established by William IV of the United Kingdom in 1830:

First and Principal Naval Aides-de-Camp

1830-1846: Lord Amelius Beauclerk
1846-1866: Sir William Parker, Bt.
1866-1873: The Earl of Lauderdale
1873-1878: Sir James Hope
1878-1879: Hon. Sir Henry Keppel
1879-1886: Sir Astley Key
1886-1895: Sir Geoffrey Hornby
1895-1897: Sir Algernon Lyons
1897-1899: Sir Nowell Salmon
1899-1901: Sir Michael Culme-Seymour, Bt.
1901-1902: Sir James Erskine
1902-1903: Sir Edward Seymour
1903-1904: Sir Henry Stephenson
1904-1911: Sir John Fisher
1911-1913: Sir Lewis Beaumont
1913-1914: Sir Edmund Poë
1914-1917: Sir George Callaghan
1917-1919: Sir Henry Jackson
1919-1922: Sir Stanley Colville
1922-1924: Sir Charles Madden, Bt.
1924-1925: Sir Somerset Gough-Calthorpe
1925-1926: Sir Montague Browning
1926-1928: Sir Arthur Leveson
1928-1929: Sir Richard Phillimore
1929-1930: Sir William Goodenough

1930: Sir Edwyn Alexander-Sinclair
1930-1931: Sir Walter Cowan, Bt.
1931-1932: Sir Hubert Brand
1932-1934: Sir Reginald Tyrwhitt, Bt.
1934-1936: Sir John Kelly
1936-1938: The Earl of Cork and Orrery
1938-1939: Sir Roger Backhouse
1939-1941: Hon. Sir Reginald Drax
1941-1943: Sir Dudley Pound
1943-1945: Sir Percy Noble
1945-1946: The Lord Tovey
1946-1948: The Lord Fraser of North Cape
1948-1949: Sir Henry Moore
1949-1952: Sir Arthur Power
1952-1953: Sir Rhoderick McGrigor
1953-1954: Sir John Edelsten
1954-1958: Hon. Sir Guy Russell
1958-1959: Sir Guy Grantham
1959-1960: Sir William Davis
1960-1962: Sir Caspar John
1962-1965: Sir Wilfrid Woods
1965-1968: Sir Desmond Dreyer
1968-1970: Sir John Frewen
1970-1972: Sir Horace Law
1972-1974: Sir Michael Pollock

Since 1972, the office has been united with that of First Sea Lord.

Flag aide-de-camp
Flag aide-de-camp is the designation given to the next most senior naval aide-de-camp after the First and Principal Naval ADC. Between 1972 and 2012, the Commander-in-Chief Naval Home Command invariably held this appointment (from 1994 to 2012 the post of Commander-in-Chief Naval Home Command, and with it the office of Flag aide-de-camp, was united with the job of Second Sea Lord). In October 2012 the post of Commander-in-Chief Naval Home Command was abolished and the current status of the appointment of Flag aide-de-camp is unclear.
The 2017 Navy Directory does not list any such person among the aides-de-camp.

References

Aides